Tadami Ueno (born 9 December 1948) is a Japanese professional golfer.

Ueno played on the Japan Golf Tour, winning seven times.

Professional wins (8)

Japan Golf Tour wins (7)

Senior wins (1)
1999 Japan PGA Senior Championship

Team appearances
World Cup (representing Japan): 1990

External links

Japanese male golfers
Japan Golf Tour golfers
Sportspeople from Hiroshima Prefecture
1948 births
Living people